Dario Argento's World of Horror is an Italian documentary film that chronicles the career of Italian director Dario Argento.

Release
Dario Argento's World of Horror was released in West Germany on home video on August 1988.

Reception
From contemporary reviews, an anonymous reviewer in Fangoria, who found the film "fascinating but also strangely endearing" noting that the documentary was "a delightful eye-opener, An Americans who want to know what all the fuss is bout this visionary writer-director can get a good start here." Tim Lucas wrote in Fangoria that the documentary was "fascinating" and offered many scenes that were at the time cut from American releases of Argento's films including The Bird with the Crystal Plumage, The Cat o' Nine Tails, Four Flies on Grey Velvet, Tenebrae and Suspiria.
 Lucas also proclaimed that the films "real accomplishment is its portrait of Argento's professional intensity and dedication; he clearly deserves to be taken more seriously by American film audiences, critics, and distributors."

References

External links 
 

Films directed by Michele Soavi
Documentary films about film directors and producers
Italian documentary films
Documentary films about horror
Dario Argento
Films scored by Claudio Simonetti
1980s Italian films